Myint Aung (1931 – 1996) was a  Burmese film director and film actor. He was the father of famous actress Mo Mo Myint Aung.

Biography
Myint Aung was born to Daw Aye Nit and U Kyauk Kwe in Kawa in Bago Division in 1931. He founded Myint Aung Film Company in 1957. Some of his famous films he directed and acted in were Maung Yupa Yon, and Zatlan Pa Ma. Although his other famous films like Chit Nyima (1957), Mya Pan Wutyi (1957), Myitta Shwe Yi (1960) produced stars as well as Myanmar Academy Award winners, the award eluded the director himself.

Filmography
Lay Hte Ga Hpuza (1952)
Moe Lon Pat Le
Nyaungyan Nyi Naung
Mya Haywun (1953)
Chit Ma Ma (1955)
Maung Yupa Yon (1957)
Chit Nyima (1957)
Mya Pan Wutyi (1957)
Chit Khae Tar A Mhan Par Pae (1958)
Chit Ta A Mhan Be (1958)
Myitta Shwe Yi (1960)
Mwe So Thaw Meinkalay

Burmese male film actors
Burmese film directors
Burmese film producers
1931 births
1996 deaths
People from Bago Region
20th-century Burmese male actors